Paragon is a supervillain published by DC Comics. He first appeared in Justice League of America vol. 1 #224 (March 1984), and was created by Kurt Busiek and Chuck Patton.

Fictional character biography

In his initial appearance Paragon faced and defeated the Justice League of America by duplicating their unique abilities, but was defeated by the Red Tornado, an inorganic android, and Green Lantern (armed with his power ring), whose artificial powers Paragon could not duplicate. In his earliest appearance Cochin's stated goal was the eradication of all those he considered "inferior"—more than three-quarters of the human race.

After his single appearance Paragon went unseen for more than two decades (real time). However, he has recently become a recurring opponent of Superman, although one who in certain circumstances was seen to help the Man of Steel.

Powers and abilities
 Cochin has the ability to duplicate the physical and mental abilities of organic beings in his vicinity and use them himself, even magnifying them by a considerable amount. This includes the ability to copy superhuman powers.
 Unlike supervillains such as the Parasite, who drains the powers of beings, Paragon does not take his target's unique abilities, but rather duplicates them.
 He is unable to copy the powers of inorganic beings such as the Red Tornado or weapons such as Green Lantern's ring.
 In his original appearance, Paragon would lose someone's power as soon as they were out of his range. In his recent appearances, he was able to prolong the time he retains an ability through the use of a special high-tech suit of his own design.

References

External links
DCU Guide: Paragon
Cosmic Teams: Paragon

Characters created by Kurt Busiek
Characters created by Chuck Patton
Comics characters introduced in 1984
DC Comics supervillains
DC Comics metahumans